Norte may refer to:

Places
 Norte, Cape Verde, a village in the east-northeastern part of the island of Boa Vista
 Norte de Mexico, a region of Mexico
 Norte Region, Brazil, a region of Brazil
 Norte Region, Portugal, a NUTSII Region of Portugal

Other
 Norte (wind), strong cold northeasterly wind which blows in Mexico along the shores of the Gulf of Mexico
 Norteños, a coalition of traditionally Latino gangs in Northern California
Norte, the End of History, 2013 Filipino drama film

See also 
 North (disambiguation) (norte is Portuguese, Spanish and Galician for north)
 Nord (disambiguation), French, Italian, Danish and Catalan for north